A teacher is a person who helps students to acquire knowledge, competence, or virtue.

Teacher or The Teacher may also refer to:

Film and television
 The Teacher (1974 film), an American film directed by Hickmet Avedis
 The Teacher (1977 film), a Cuban film directed by Octavio Cortázar
 "Teacher" (Fullmetal Alchemist), a 2004 television episode
 A Teacher, a 2013 American film directed by Hannah Fidell
 The Teacher (2016 film), a Slovak-Czech film directed by Jan Hřebejk
 The Teacher (2017 film), a French film directed by Olivier Ayache-Vidal
 A Teacher (miniseries), a 2020 TV series based on the 2013 film
 The Teacher (2022 TV series), British TV miniseries starring Sheridan Smith
 The Teacher (2022 film), a 2022 Malayalam-language Indian film

Music
 "Teacher" (Jethro Tull song), 1970
 "Teacher" (Nick Jonas song), 2014
 "The Teacher" (song), a 1986 song by Big Country
 "The Teacher", a 1982 song by Magnum from Chase the Dragon
 "The Teacher", a 2001 song by Paul Simon from You're the One
 "The Teacher", a 1999 song by Super Furry Animals from Guerrilla

People with the surname
 Brian Teacher (born 1954), American tennis player
 Kaumudi Teacher (1917–2009), Indian freedom activist

Other uses
 Teacher (Latter Day Saints), an office in the Aaronic priesthood
 Teacher (role variant), in the Keirsey Temperament Sorter personality questionnaire
 Teacher's Highland Cream, a blended Scotch whisky
 A Teacher Partylist, a party-list in Philippine politics
 Qoheleth, or Teacher, subject of the Old Testament book Ecclesiastes
 Sir Leigh Teabing, or the Teacher, a fictional character in The Da Vinci Code
 The Teacher, an antagonist in Little Nightmares II

See also
 
 
 Teachers (disambiguation)
 Titser (disambiguation)
 Guru, Sanskrit term for teacher, guide, expert, or master
 Paraprofessional educator, a teaching-related position 
 Professor, an academic rank
 Rabbi, a spiritual leader or religious teacher in Judaism
 Tutor, a person who provides assistance on certain subject areas or skills